B.K. Birla Public School, Kalyan (CBSE Board) is a school in the Thane district of Mumbai Metropolis, Maharashtra India.

About
B.K. Birla Public School, Kalyan is a co-educational public school managed by Kalyan Citizen's Education Society (KCES) and affiliated to Central Board of Secondary Education, Delhi. The school was founded in 1998 with the blessings of Syt. Basant Kumar Birla, Chairman of B.K. Birla Group of Companies and Dr. Sarala Birla. The school is located adjacent B.K. Birla College, which also comes under the aegis of KCES. The school is spread over six acres of land and has the infrastructure of international standard. Mrs. Ranjana Jangra is the current principal of the school. It was ranked 6th in Mumbai in the national curriculum by the Times School Survey, 2016.

Co-curricular activities
Birla School also has a new basketball court, lawn, a huge football ground, a multi-purpose hall and an activity hall. The school has 2 physics labs, 2 chemistry labs, 2 biology labs, 1 geography lab, 1 math lab and a sports room. It also has 2 computer labs. Yoga, martial arts, aerobics, music (singing and instrumental), dance (classical and contemporary), art and craft, maths club, reading club, science club, nature club, oratorical club, art and craft club, creative club, drama club and sports club are some of the included activities round the year. It has 2 library with a wide range of books.

Located in the heart of the Taluka, Birla School comes under the KCES and Century Rayon, Shahad led by Mr. O. R. Chitlange.

References

External links
 Documentary Film on Birla School by Makshi Infotech

Education in Kalyan-Dombivli
Schools in Thane district